Ambenonium (as ambenonium dichloride, trade name Mytelase) is a cholinesterase inhibitor used in the management of myasthenia gravis.

It is classified as a reversible cholinesterase inhibitor.

Mechanism of action
Ambenonium exerts its actions against myasthenia gravis by competitive reversible inhibition of acetylcholinesterase, the enzyme responsible for the hydrolysis of acetylcholine. Myasthenia gravis occurs when the body produces antibodies against acetylcholine receptors, and thus inhibits signal transmission across the neuromuscular junction. Ambenonium reversibly binds acetylcholinesterase, inactivates it and therefore increases levels of acetylcholine. This, in turn, facilitates transmission of impulses across the myoneural junction and effectively treats the disease.

Indications
Ambenonium is used to treat muscle weakness due to disease or defect of the neuromuscular junction (myasthenia gravis).

Ambenonium was withdrawn from the market in the United States in 2010.

References

Acetylcholinesterase inhibitors
Chloroarenes
Quaternary ammonium compounds
Carboxamides
Chlorides
Bisquaternary anticholinesterases